Skeezer Pleezer is the second album by UTFO, released in 1986 on Select Records. The most notable song was "Split Personality," a paean to dissociative identity disorder.

Track listing
"Just Watch"
"Where Did You Go?"
"We Work Hard"
"Kangol & Doc"
"The House Will Rock"
"Split Personality"
"Pick Up the Pace"
"Bad Luck Barry"
(untitled hidden track)

1986 albums
Select Records albums
UTFO albums
Albums produced by Full Force